The limbic lobe is an arc-shaped cortical region of the limbic system, on the medial surface of each cerebral hemisphere of the mammalian brain, consisting of parts of the frontal, parietal and temporal lobes. The term is ambiguous, with some authors including the paraterminal gyrus, the subcallosal area, the cingulate gyrus, the parahippocampal gyrus, the dentate gyrus, the hippocampus and the subiculum; while the Terminologia Anatomica includes the cingulate sulcus, the cingulate gyrus, the isthmus of cingulate gyrus, the fasciolar gyrus, the parahippocampal gyrus, the parahippocampal sulcus, the dentate gyrus, the fimbrodentate sulcus, the fimbria of hippocampus, the collateral sulcus, and the rhinal sulcus, and omits the hippocampus.

History
Broca named the limbic lobe in 1878, identifying it with the cingulate and parahippocampal gyri, and associating it with the sense of smell - Treviranus having earlier noted that, between species, the size of the parahippocampal gyrus varies with the size of the olfactory nerve. In 1937 Papez theorized that a neural circuit (the Papez circuit) including the hippocampal formation and the cingulate gyrus constitutes the neural substrate of emotional behavior, and Klüver and Bucy reported that, in monkeys, resection involving the hippocampal formation and the amygdaloid complex has a profound effect on emotional responses. As a consequence of these publications, the idea that the entire limbic lobe is dedicated to olfaction receded, and a direct connection between emotion and the limbic lobe was established.

Gallery

References

External links

Explanatory diagram
 https://web.archive.org/web/20070328181549/http://ahsmail.uwaterloo.ca/kin356/ltm/limbic_lobe.html

Limbic system